Liveris is a surname. Notable people with the surname include:

 Andrew Liveris (born 1954), Australian executive
 Georgios Liveris (born 1932), Greek sports shooter
 Stelios Liveris (born 1984), Greek footballer

See also
 Liveri, municipality in Italy
 Liveris Andritsos (born 1959) Greek basketballer

Greek-language surnames